Between the late 19th and early 20th centuries, many wealthy Parsis, began to travel to Iran from Bombay and Gujarat, to revive the Zoroastrian faith and traditions among the stagnating Zoroastrian community in Iran at the time, with prominent personalities such as civil rights activist, Manekji Limji Hateria of Surat  gaining local renown.

In 1920s, about 180 Indian families went to Zahidan. Following this initial influx, some of them started settling down in the nearby towns of Birijand, Zabol and Mashhad. In 1950s, more Indians migrated to Iran and settled primarily in Tehran. They consisted of Sikhs and Gujaratis. In the 1960s and early 1970s, about 10,000 Indian doctors, engineers, and teachers moved to Iran as a response to the open policies initiated by the Shah of Iran, but most of them left Iran after the Iranian revolution.

Today, over 4,000 non-resident Indians are residing in Iran.

See also
Hinduism in Iran
India–Iran relations
Sikhism in Iran

References

External links
Indian Diaspora in Iran

Ethnic groups in Iran
Iran